Hypostomus latifrons is a species of catfish in the family Loricariidae. It is native to South America, where it occurs in the Paraguay River basin. The species reaches 28.7 cm (11.3 inches) SL and is believed to be a facultative air-breather.

H. latifrons appears in the aquarium trade, where it is typically referred to either as the Paraguay pleco or by one of two associated L-numbers, which are L-051 and L-281.

References 

latifrons
Fish described in 1986